Ory Dessau (Hebrew: אורי דסאו) is an art curator and critic, working and living in Tel Aviv, Israel.

One of his renowned works, "Guess who died" , explored the image and physiognomy of Palestinian late president Yasser Arafat.

From 2003 Dessau is working as an independent curator with different art institutes in Israel, such as Tel-Aviv Museum of Art, Ein Harod Museum of Art and Herzliya Museum for contemporary Art. In July 2007 Dessau was chosen to curate the annual "Omanut Haaretz" ("Art of the Country") exhibition at the Sukkot holiday in September .

External links
Ory Dessau interview on CNN.
"Yasir, The Icon" Story from the Jewish Week magazine. 
"Guess Who Died" Exhibition on Dvir Gallery Tel Aviv.

Year of birth missing (living people)
Living people
Israeli art critics
Israeli curators
Israeli Jews